Mount Ayles is a mountain located on Ellesmere Island, Nunavut, Canada. It forms part of the border of the Quttinirpaaq National Park. Like the nearby Ayles Ice Shelf, the mountain was named by the Geological Survey of Canada in 1965 for Adam Ayles, a petty officer  on-board HMS Alert, who was serving in the British Arctic Expedition under George Nares.

References

External links
Schedule 2 of Bill C-70

Ayles
One-thousanders of Nunavut